Bankapura Peacock Sanctuary is a wildlife sanctuary inside the Bankapura Fort in Haveri District, Karnataka, India.

Fodder grown exclusively for Khilari bulls in the area has become an ideal peafowl habitat. The moat is about 36 km long, 10–15 metres wide and 7–8 metres deep. The banks of the moat are covered with Acacia, Neem and Ficus plants. Crops like maize and jowar  grown regularly for cattle are delicacies of the peafowl. The navilu pakshidhama in Bankapur is only the second sanctuary in the country that is exclusively engaged in the conservation and breeding of peacocks.

Understanding the great presence of peacocks in the region, the Government of India declared Bankapura as a peacock sanctuary on June 9, 2006. This sanctuary is situated on 139 acres of land which has the remains of the historic Bankapura Fort. The high mound and deep trenches of the land have provided a perfect home for these birds. The sanctuary is located on the cattle breeding farm which was set up in 1919 after the First World War.

According to a rough estimate, there are more than 1,000 peacocks and peahen in the sanctuary. Also, minimal human intervention has helped in the breeding of these birds. They walk on the 4 km mound and also perch on green trees. The officials of the Department of Veterinary Sciences have shown great interest in the conservation of these birds, making it easy for the  Forest Department to carry on with their job.

Bankpura Fort is home for not only for peafowl, but also a number of other birds like great-horned owl, babbler, magpie, robin, Asian green bee-eater, nightjar, spotted myna, paradise flycatcher, Indian robin, spotted dove, parakeets, kingfisher, grey hornbill, blue tailed bee eater, blacked winged kite, tailor bird etc.

References

   

Bird sanctuaries of Karnataka
Haveri district
2006 establishments in Karnataka
Protected areas established in 2006